Maurie D. McInnis (born January 11, 1966) is an American author and cultural historian. She currently serves as the 6th president of Stony Brook University.

Education 
McInnis attended the University of Virginia where she was a Jefferson Scholar. She received a B.A. in Art History with Highest Distinction, and her Ph.D. in the History of Art from Yale University.

Academic Scholarship 
McInnis is a renowned scholar in the cultural history of American Art in the colonial and antebellum South. Her work has focused on the relationship between art and politics in early America, especially on the politics of slavery. Her extensive publications have received numerous awards. Her first book, "The Politics of Taste in Antebellum Charleston," was awarded the Spiro Kostof Award by the Society of Architectural Historians (among others).

Her penultimate book, "Slaves Waiting for Sale: Abolitionist Art and the American Slave Trade" was published in 2011 and awarded the Charles C. Eldredge Book Prize from the Smithsonian American Art Museum as well as the Library of Virginia Literary Award for nonfiction. She recently published, "Educated in Tyranny: Slavery at Thomas Jefferson's University." She has also served as a curator, consultant, and advisor to multiple art museums and historic sites.

Career 
McInnis served as vice provost for academic affairs at the University of Virginia. Over her almost 20 years' experience at UVA, McInnis held various academic leadership and administrative appointments, including vice provost for academic affairs, associate dean for undergraduate education programs in the College of Arts and Sciences, director of American Studies, and as a professor of art history. She joined the faculty of UVA in 1998, earned tenure in 2005 and became a full professor in 2011.

She served as the provost of the University of Texas at Austin from 2016 to 2020.

On March 26, 2020, Dr. McInnis was announced as the 6th President of Stony Brook University. She began serving in this role on July 1, 2020.

Awards and honors

National Endowment for the Humanities
Virginia Foundation for the Humanities
 Charles C. Eldredge Prize, presented to Slaves Waiting for Sale: Abolitionist Art and the American Slave Trade, for outstanding scholarship in the field of American Art, 2012.
Library of Virginia Literary Award for non-fiction, 2012 for Slaves Waiting for Sale: Abolitionist Art and the American Slave Trade.
 Spiro Kostof Book Award, Society of Architectural Historians, presented to The Politics of Taste in Antebellum Charleston for the book that has made the greatest contribution to our understanding of urbanism and its relationship with architecture, 2007.
 Fred B. Kniffen Book Award, Pioneer America Society, presented to The Politics of Taste in Antebellum Charleston for the best book in the field of material culture in North America, 2007.
 George C. Rogers, Jr. Book Award, South Carolina Historical Society, presented to The Politics of Taste in Antebellum Charleston for the best book about South Carolina, 2006.
 Thomas Jefferson Visiting Fellow, Downing College, Cambridge University

Selected publications 

 Educated in Tyranny - Slavery at Thomas Jefferson's University. University of Virginia Press, 2019. (Co-editor)
 Slaves Waiting for Sale: Abolitionist Art and the American Slave Trade. University of Chicago Press, 2011. (issued in cloth and paperback)
 Shaping the Body Politic: Art and Political Formation in the Early Nation, co-edited volume with Louis P. Nelson. Includes McInnis’ essay, “Revisiting Cincinnatus: Houdon’s George Washington.” Charlottesville: University of Virginia Press, 2011.
 The Politics of Taste in Antebellum Charleston. Chapel Hill: University of North Carolina Press, 2005. (issued in paperback in 2016)
 A Jeffersonian Ideal: Selections from the Dr. and Mrs. Henry C. Landon III Collection of Fine and Decorative Arts. Charlottesville, VA: University of Virginia Art Museum, 2005. (Served as contributor and co-editor).
 In Pursuit of Refinement: Charlestonians Abroad 1740-1860. Columbia: University of South Carolina Press, 1999. (Lead author and editor). (issued in cloth and paperback)

References 

1966 births
Living people
Women art historians
American women historians
American art historians
20th-century American women writers
21st-century American women writers
University of Virginia alumni
Yale University alumni
University of Texas at Austin faculty
University of Virginia faculty
Historians of the Southern United States